Kamana Prabhakara Rao, is a politician from Andhra Pradesh in India. He is contesting for Mandapeta assembly constituency, representing the Indian National Congress.

Social activities
 Worked as Life Member of the Indian Red Cross Society & arranged massive flood relief to Godavari 1986 flood victims distributed help to 600 flood victims with the patronage from M/s. Nagarjuna Fertilizers and Chemicals Limited, Kakinada.
 Running Voluntary organization, Dr.DNR Bhavan Trust, which works on Education, Health and Women Empowerment, Blood Donation Camps; and Dr.DNR Bhavan Computer Education and Information Technology (affiliated to State Board of Technical Education and Training), which offers free computer education to poor people of Mandapeta.

Political life

 Kamana, led the student's wing of Congress Party, in 1978 and protested against prosecution of Indira Gandhi, Janata Party Government
 Chairman of the Alamuru Constituency Electricity Advisory Committee 1993-94
 Member of the District Level Prohibition Committee of East Godavari District 1993-94
 WHIP & Floor Leader of Congress Party MPTCs  in the Mandal Parishad Mandapeta 1994-99 
 MPTC Member from Yeditha 1994-99
 Convener of the District Panchayat Raj Abhiyan of  East Godavari District Congress Committee 1993-98
 Organizing Secretary of East Godavari District Youth Congress 1986-89
 Organizing Secretary of East Godavari District Congress Committee 1990-94
 Official Spokesperson, East Godavari District Congress Committee 2000-2007
 Member, East Godavari District Telecom Advisory Committee, BSNL 2003-2006
 P.C.C. Member  2002-2013
 Coordinator, Pithapuram Constituency Congress Co- ordination Committee 2003-2004
 Election In-charge for Peddapuram and Samarlkot Municipalities held in 2006 for success of the Candidates.
 Election In-charge for Kadiyam Constituency for Z.P.T.C. and M.P.T.C. elections held in 2006 for success of the candidates
 Reception Committee Member for AICC Plenary Session held at Hyderabad in the month January, 2006 for success of the session
 In charge of 2009 elections RampaChodavaram Assembly Constituency, played a vital role for the success of the candidate.

Stand on State division
PCC secretary Kamana Prabhakara Rao issued a statement by welcoming the AICC's decision to suspend the MPs who are working against the interests of the party, on Andhra Pradesh division issue.

References

Living people
Indian National Congress politicians from Andhra Pradesh
Telugu politicians
1962 births
People from East Godavari district